Saint-Amour is a 2016 French-Belgian comedy-drama film written, produced and directed by Benoît Delépine and Gustave Kervern.

Plot
The story of a father and a son, farmers, whose relationships are conflictual. In an attempt to forge a new complicity, they go on the wine trail, with a Parisian taxi, crossed at the exit of the Agricultural Fair.

Cast

 Gérard Depardieu as Jean
 Benoît Poelvoorde as Bruno
 Vincent Lacoste as Mike
 Céline Sallette as Venus
 Gustave Kervern as The Uncle
 Yolande Moreau as Marie (voice)
 Chiara Mastroianni as The boss of the chip stand
 Ana Girardot as The twin
 Andréa Ferréol as The breakfast woman
 Michel Houellebecq as The owner of the guest house
 Izïa Higelin as The ex of Bruno
 Ovidie as The realtor
 Raymond Defossé as Follin
 Solène Rigot as Jennifer
 Xavier Mathieu as Didier
 Marthe Guérin Caufman as Marie de Picardie
 Madphil as Pipoune

References

External links
 

2016 films
2016 comedy-drama films
2010s road comedy-drama films
Belgian road comedy-drama films
2010s French-language films
French road comedy-drama films
Films directed by Benoît Delépine
Films directed by Gustave Kervern
Films about farmers
Films about wine
French-language Belgian films
2010s French films